Herviera is a genus of sea snails, marine gastropod mollusks in the family Pyramidellidae, the pyrams and their allies.

Species
Species within the genus Herviera include:
 Herviera gliriella (Melvill & Standen, 1896)
 Herviera isidella (Melvill & Standen, 1898)
 Herviera patricia (Pilsbry, 1918)

References

 Schander C., Hori S. & Lundberg J. (1999), Anatomy, phylogeny and biology of Odostomella and Herviera, with the description of a new species of Odostomella (Mollusca, Heterostropha, Pyramidellidae).Ophelia 51 (1): 39-76

External links
 To World Register of Marine Species

Pyramidellidae
Monotypic gastropod genera